St. Mary's Church is a historic Catholic church in the eastern United States, at Fairfax Station, Virginia, a suburb southwest of Washington, D.C.  Built  in 1858, it is a rectangular, one-story, gable-front, frame structure in the Gothic Revival style.  It has a steeple at the entrance and a large Gothic arched window over the entrance door.  St. Mary's was the first Catholic church built within Fairfax County, and its early parishioners were primarily Irish immigrants employed by the Orange and Alexandria Railroad.

During the Civil War, wounded were brought here by train to be treated and evacuated to Alexandria and Washington after the Second Battle of Bull Run (Manassas) in late August 1862. Volunteer Clara Barton, an employee of the U.S. Patent Office in Washington, tended to the wounded and made this church her headquarters; she later founded the American Red Cross in 1881.

St. Mary's gained a listing on the National Register of Historic Places  in 1976. The historic church property belongs to Saint Mary of Sorrows Catholic Church in the Diocese of Arlington. The historic church is still in use, although a new primary parish center was built several miles northeast and opened in 1980. The annual Labor Day picnic in early September continues to be held on the grounds (primarily its graveyard), and is one of the oldest celebrations in the county.

St Mary's Church is part of the larger parish of St Mary of the Sorrows

References

External links

St. Mary of Sorrows Catholic Church – History
Find a Grave – Saint Mary of Sorrows Catholic Church Cemetery

1858 establishments in Virginia
Carpenter Gothic church buildings in Virginia
Roman Catholic churches completed in 1858
Churches in Fairfax County, Virginia
Churches in the Roman Catholic Diocese of Arlington
National Register of Historic Places in Fairfax County, Virginia
Churches on the National Register of Historic Places in Virginia
19th-century Roman Catholic church buildings in the United States